Avanne-Aveney is a commune in the Doubs department in the Bourgogne-Franche-Comté region of eastern France.

The inhabitants of the commune are known as Avannais or Avannaises.

Geography
Avanne-Aveney is located to the immediate south-west of Besançon with the town of Avanne joined to the Besançon urban area. The smaller town of Aveney is on the opposite bank of the river linked by a bridge. Access to the commune is by the D106 from Besançon which continues west to Grandfontaine. Route nationale N83 passes through the south-east of the commune from Beure in the north-east to Samson in the south. The D367 links Avanne to Aveney via a bridge across the river. The west and the east of the commune have extensive forests and the two villages have a substantial urban area leaving a small amount of land as farmland.

The Doubs river flows through the south-east of the commune as it flows south-west to join the Saône at Verdun-sur-le-Doubs.

Neighbouring communes and villages

Toponymy
Two propositions exist for the origin of the name of the commune. According to some linguists Avanne takes its name from the Latin avena  meaning "oats" and, by extension, poor ground. For others, the name is from the Gallic abona meaning "river".

History

Antiquity
The occupation of the site in Gallo-Roman times is attested by the discovery of remains of a building in the north of the commune on Rue des Combots when the construction of the Grands Prés housing estate in the 1970s was finished. Unfortunately this was not reported at the time so these remains have not been studied except from the descriptions. A hypocaust, suggesting the existence of a Roman villa, was located on Rue des Blotets.

Ancient Times
The Lordship of Avanne was attested in 1092 and was dependent from the beginning on the lords of Montfaucon and the Counts of Burgundy. In the 12th century the lords of Faucogney had rights which they yielded in 1280 to the Count of Burgundy. The lordship then returned to the lords of Faucogney in the 14th century, then to the Dukes of Aumont in the 15th century which they kept until 1723. It was then owned by the Pourcheresse de Fraisans family.

Genealogy of the house of Avanne
The Chateau of Avanne, which was located on the border of the territory of Besançon, was owned by the lords of that name. It appears that this house was then passed to the lords of Faucogney: Gislebert de Faucogney, lord of Avanne, in 1180, gave land planted in vines and the use of his forests to the Abbey of Notre-Dame de Billon. This gift was confirmed by Aymé de Faucogney. Guy d'Avanne had already affixed his name to the donation made by Archbishop Hugh III to the Church of Sainte-Madeleine of Besançon in 1092. Hugues d'Avanne was cited in a title of Billon in 1163. Renaud d'Avanne, canon of Sainte-Madeleine, in 1189, gave a one third part of the Avanne Mill to the church. Thibaud d'Avanne, canon and cantor of the same church, in 1246 ceded to his chapter the share that he had in his kiln, called Kiln of Seet typochal, located at Charmont.

Hugues d'Avanne, knight, gave a meix located at the village of Estu to the abbey of Saint-Paul de Besançon. He was the father of Jean and Etienne who were mentioned in the will of their uncle Thibaud. Jean d'Avanne, knight, in 1246 approved the donation of the Charmont kiln made to the Chapter of Sainte-Madeleine by his brother. His son, Peter, was a Gentleman and he married Oudette, daughter of Raoul de Saint-Sevigne, knight. In 1287 Aymé d'Avanne, son of Thibaud d'Avanne, Gentleman, agreed to sell a vineyard at Étiennette created by Lambert d'Avanne, a citizen of Besançon.

The current commune of Avanne-Aveney is the result of the merger of the communes of Avanne and Aveney, at first as an Association in 1973 then a full merger in 2004.

Vineyards have long been a major resource in Avanne, especially until the 18th century. There are still many traces of the past with old houses equipped with wine cellars. Originally a ferry connected the two villages but it was replaced by a metal bridge in 1893.

Heraldry

Administration

List of Successive Mayors

Mayors from 1973

Demography
In 2017 the commune had 2,255 inhabitants. Prior to 1973 the population figures shown include both the former communes of Avanne and Aveney.

Culture and heritage

Civil heritage

The commune has one site that is registered as an historical monument:
 An Ornamental Garden (1851) in the Chateau of Avanne park.

Other points of interest
 Several viewing points from the Valmy rock and the Martelin cave with magnificent views of the Doubs loop and the banks of the Doubs over 6 km.
 At the Valmy Rock stands a monument to the memory of the martyrs of the Guy Mocquet and the Marius Vallet resistance fighter groups who were shot at the Citadel of Besançon on 26 September 1943 or died in deportation.
 The Bridge, built in 1893, is a bridge originally intended to carry a railway line at another site that was bought by the communes Avanne and Aveney to replace the ferry that used to link the two villages. This is one of the few bridges that was not destroyed during World War II. It allowed the passage of the Allied armies in September 1944 and was for this reason called The Liberator. It was completely renovated in 2000 and doubled with a walkway.
 The Chateau of Avanne whose history is closely linked to that of the lords and nobles of Montferrand from the 13th to the 15th century and affiliated to the County of Burgundy. It became part of a series of fortifications which included those of Montferrand-le-Château, Thoraise, Torpes, Corcondray, and Fourg. It was built in 1280 on top of the cliff which overlooks the Grande Rue. It was probably destroyed by the armies of Louis XI when they conquered the County after the death of Charles the Bold in 1477. The last tower collapsed in 1816. Only a few stairs, a wall, and some foundations remain of this chateau.

Religious heritage
The commune has one religious building that is registered as an historical monument:
 The Church of Avanne (1826) is the work of architect Pierre Marnotte. This building was a joint production of the two unmerged communes at the time. The Church contains one item that is registered as an historical object:
 A Statue: Saint Vernier (19th century)

Photo gallery

Notable people linked to the commune
 Alexandre Verdel, local bard, author of a song  La Cancoillotte.
 Monseigneur Léon Aimé Taverdet,  Bishop of Langres from 1981 to 2000.
 René Paillard, resistance fighter, member of the Guy Mocquet group, shot at the Citadel of Besançon on 26 September 1943.

See also
 Communes of the Doubs department

Notes and references

Notes

References

Bibliography
 Jean-Baptiste Guillaume, Genealogical History of the Squires of Salins in the County of Burgundy, Jean-Antoine Vieille, Besançon, 1757, pp. 91 to 94

External links
 Avanne-Aveney official website 
 Avanne-Aveney on Géoportail, National Geographic Institute (IGN) website 
 Avanne on the 1750 Cassini Map

Communes of Doubs